The Globe Locomotive Works was a late-19th century manufacturer of railroad steam locomotives and other machinery based in Boston, Massachusetts. During that time the firm built some one hundred steam locomotives for railroads throughout the United States. The Elephant, a wood-burning type 4-4-0 built by the company in 1849 for the Union Pacific Railroad, had the distinction of being the first locomotive to travel west of the Rocky Mountains. The unit was subsequently renamed the C.K. Garrison (an appellation it retained for some 15 years), and ultimately carried the name Pioneer beginning around 1870 (not to be confused with the 4-2-0 named Pioneer that is preserved in Chicago).

In 1864 the company (a joint venture of John Souther and D.A. Pickering) ceased producing locomotives and instead focused on the manufacture of steam shovels. From thereon it operated as the Globe Works Company.

History of Massachusetts
Defunct locomotive manufacturers of the United States
Massachusetts in the American Civil War
Industrial buildings and structures in Massachusetts